Mesosini is a tribe of longhorn beetles of the subfamily Lamiinae.

Taxonomy
 Aemocia
 Aesopida
 Agelasta
 Anagelasta
 Anancylus
 Anipocregyes
 Cacia
 Caciella
 Choeromorpha
 Clyzomedus
 Coptops
 Cristipocregyes
 Demodes
 Elelea
 Epimesosa
 Ereis
 Eurymesosa
 Falsocacia
 Falsomesosella
 Golsinda
 Hypocacia
 Leptomesosa
 Liosynaphaeta
 Mesocacia
 Mesoereis
 Mesoplanodes
 Mesosa
 Mesosaimia
 Metacoptops
 Metipocregyes
 Microcacia
 Mimagelasta
 Mimanancylus
 Mimocacia
 Mimosaimia
 Mnemea
 Mutatocoptops
 Pachyosa
 Paracaciella
 Paracoptops
 Paraereis
 Paragolsinda
 Paraplanodes
 Paripocregyes
 Planodes
 Plesiomesosites †
 Pseudipocregyes
 Pseudochoeromorpha
 Pseudoclyzomedus
 Pseudocoptops
 Pseudoplanodes
 Pseudozelota
 Silgonda
 Sorbia
 Spinipocregyes
 Stenomesosa
 Synaphaeta
 Syrrhopeus
 Therippia
 Trichomesosa
 Zelota

References